Anathallis barbulata is a species of orchid plant native to Guyana.

References 

barbulata
Flora of Guyana
Plants described in 1859